Polistepipona is an Afrotropical genus of potter wasps.

References 

Biological pest control wasps
Potter wasps